Sadanam Krishnadas Nair (1969-2018) was a well-known actor of Kathakali from the Palakkad district of Kerala, in South India. He was born on 10 May 1969 in the village of Koonathara near Shoranur. He was joined at Sadanam Kathakali academy in the month of June 1983 and started the training under Kalanilayam Balakrishnan, a great master of Kathakali. He has also received the best traditional training from the legendary Kathakali actor-scholar Keezhpadam Kumaran Nair at the same school. Sadanam Krishnadas has made his first appearance on the stage in 1983 October, enacted the role of Krishna very brilliantly and lovely. From 1984 until his death, he had been working as a Kathakali actor with the school's Kathakali troupe, various clubs and festivals all over India and in several foreign countries. Krishnadas served in his alma mater Sadanam for many years and he was a very prominent Kathakali actor to work with any leading roles in the repertory or the newly written stories. Kathakali lovers in northern kerala as well as in southern kerala, highly appreciates Krishnadas Nair's wide range capacity to enact excellently the leading anti-hero roles such as Ravana, Keechaka, Duryodhana (also called Kathi characters), Hanuman (white beard, vella thadi character), Kattalan (black beard, karutha thadi), Chuvanna thadi (red beard character), Pacha (the green or noble characters). He had an untimely death on 19 March 2018, aged just 49.

References

1969 births
Artists from Palakkad
Kathakali exponents
Living people